Kelvin Arthur Payne (born 15 February 1939) is a former Australian rules footballer who played with Footscray in the Victorian Football League (VFL).

Notes

External links 

Living people
1939 births
Australian rules footballers from Victoria (Australia)
Western Bulldogs players